The Point Four Program was a technical assistance program for "developing countries" announced by United States President Harry S. Truman in his inaugural address on January 20, 1949.  It took its name from the fact that it was the fourth foreign policy objective mentioned in the speech.

Background
By 1947 the United States found itself in a Cold War struggle against the USSR. With  White House assistants Clark Clifford and George Elsey and State Department official Ben Hardy taking the lead, the Truman administration came up with the idea for a technical assistance program as a means to win the "hearts and minds" of the developing world after countries from the Middle East, Latin America, Asia and Africa had complained about the emphasis on European aid by the U.S.

By sharing American know-how in various fields, especially agriculture, industry and health, officials could help "third world" nations—i.e., those not aligned with NATO nor the Soviets—on the development path, raise the standard of living, and show that democracy and capitalism could provide for the welfare of the individual. In his inauguration speech on January 20, 1949, President Truman stated the fourth objective of his foreign policy as follows:
"we must embark on a bold new program for making the benefits of our scientific advances and industrial progress available for the improvement and growth of underdeveloped areas.
More than half the people of the world are living in conditions approaching misery. Their food is inadequate. They are victims of disease. Their economic life is primitive and stagnant. Their poverty is a handicap and a threat both to them and to more prosperous areas.  For the first time in history, humanity possesses the knowledge and skill to relieve suffering of these people. The United States is pre-eminent among nations in the development of industrial and scientific techniques. The material resources which we can afford to use for assistance of other peoples are limited. But our imponderable resources in technical knowledge are constantly growing and are inexhaustible"

Truman denied that this was a colonial venture to dominate other countries. Rather, he insisted, "The old imperialism—exploitation for foreign profit—has no place in our plans. What we envisage is a program of development based on the concepts of democratic fair-dealing. All countries, including our own, will greatly benefit from a constructive program for the better use of the world’s human and natural resources."

This was not a call for economic aid—on the order of the Marshall Plan but for the US to share its "know-how" and help nations develop with technical assistance. There was bipartisan support led by Republican Congressman Christian A. Herter of Massachusetts. 

Point Four was the first global U.S. foreign aid program, yet it drew some inspiration from the nation's wartime Office of the Coordinator of Inter-American Affairs (OCIAA), which extended technical assistance to Latin American countries. Nelson Rockefeller, the administrator of the OCIAA, strongly supported the establishment of Point Four in congressional hearings.

According to the US Secretary of State Dean Acheson, it was the initiative of the then legal counsel to the president Clark Clifford, who suggested to president Truman to initiate an assistance on a worldwide basis, and to include the issue in his inaugural address. According to Robert Schlesinger's book, White House Ghosts, it was Benjamin H. Hardy who first came up with the concept. After the suggestion was as good as lost in the foggy miasma of the State Department's bureaucracy, Hardy decided to bring the idea to the attention of Truman aide, George Elsey. Elsey and Clifford went on to herald the abstraction into policy. Hardy eventually left the Department of State and became the new Technical Cooperation Administration's Chief Information Officer.

Implementation

In order to implement the program, on February 9, 1949 a new committee was established within the Department of State, known as the Technical Assistance Group, chaired by Samuel Hayes. The program was approved by Congress on June 5, 1950 in the Foreign Economic Assistance Act, which allotted to the program a budget of $25,000,000 for fiscal year 1950/51. Describing the new program, Truman noted that, "Communist propaganda holds that the free nations are incapable of providing a decent standard of living for the millions of people in under-developed areas of the earth.  The Point Four program will be one of our principal ways of demonstrating the complete falsity of that charge."

After Congressional approval on October 27, 1950, the Technical Cooperation Administration (TCA) was established within the Department of State to run the Point Four program and the OCIAA became incorporated into the new organization. Henry G. Bennett was the first TCA administrator from 1950 to 1951.

The program was carried out with the countries whose governments concluded bilateral agreements with the US government regarding aid under the program, and the TCA established field missions within those countries, which worked to improve agricultural output and distributed technical know-how on improving the economy in general. The first government to do so was the government of Iran, on October 19, 1950.

The Point Four Program was different from other programs in that it was not confined to any specific region; it was extended to countries such as Pakistan, Israel, Jordan, . The American University of Beirut (AUB) also received funding from the Point Four program to expand its operations.

Among the first nations to gain extensive technical assistance was India. From 1950–1951 India saw the implementation of a penicillin plantation, an increase in schools and medical research facilities as well as dam construction. In addition to economic assistance India also agreed to maintain a democratic government. U.S. Officials hoped this would prevent India forming alliances with the Soviet Union and China.

Republican President Dwight D. Eisenhower discarded the Point Four name in favour of simply referring to it as a 'technical assistance program', and reorganized the TCA into the Foreign Operations Administration; its successor agencies include the International Cooperation Administration and the present-day Agency for International Development.

Legacy of the program
The Point Four Program was the first US plan designed to improve social, economic and political conditions in 'underdeveloped' nations. It marked the promotion of international development policy to the centre of the U.S. Foreign Policy framework.

Although designed to uplift nations, the programme's legacy was one of self-interest as America improved their imports of strategical raw materials, without significantly alleviating the partnered nations of deprivation. The post-war climate and rising threat of communism alongside lack of investment from both congress and American businessmen led to the faltering of the Point Four Program.

See also
Locke Mission

References

Further reading

Primary sources
 
 Foreign Relations of the United States, 1949, vol. I, pp. 757–788 (diplomatic documents on the program); pp. 846–874; pp. 1641–1665
  & 
 
  Guide to Papers on Point Four Programs, Truman Library

External links
 Documents section on Point Four Program at the Truman Presidential Library
 Henry Hazlitt, Illusions of Point Four (New York, 1950), a critical book about Point Four Program

Aftermath of World War II in the United States
United States foreign aid
Presidency of Harry S. Truman